Larisa Galadza (born May 19, 1971) is a Canadian diplomat who has served as Ambassador of Canada to Ukraine since 2019.

Early life and education 

Galadza's grandparents, all born in Ukraine, immigrated to the United States in 1949. She was born in Welland, Ontario, to Roman Galadza, then pastor of St. Michael Ukrainian Church, and Irene (née Bishko), both immigrated to Canada in 1969 from Kerhonkson, New York. In 1975, when Galadza was three, her family moved to Brampton, Ontario.

Galadza received her BA Hons in Political Science and Ethics at Trinity College at the University of Toronto in 1994, and an MA in International Affairs at Carleton University in 1996.

Career
In 1996, she joined the Department of National Defence. After working in policy-related positions at the Privy Council Office in 2001 and at the Treasury Board Secretariat from 2003 to 2006, she moved to Public Safety Canada, where she was Director of Strategic Policy and Research and then senior director for National Security Policy. From 2012 to 2014, she served at the Privy Council Office as director of operations for the Social Affairs Committee of Cabinet, and then, from 2014 to 2016, she was Director General of Admissibility at Citizenship and Immigration Canada. In 2016, she became director general of the Peace and Stabilization Operations Program at Global Affairs Canada.

On November 4, 2019, she became the Ambassador of Canada to Ukraine. She continues to serve in this role during the 2022 Russian invasion of Ukraine.

See also
 Embassy of Canada in Kyiv
 Canada–Ukraine relations

References

Living people
University of Toronto alumni
Carleton University alumni
Canadian women ambassadors
Ambassadors of Canada to Ukraine
Trinity College (Canada) alumni
1971 births